Crypturgus is a genus of typical bark beetles in the family Curculionidae. There are at least 30 described species in Crypturgus.

Species
These 37 species belong to the genus Crypturgus:

 Crypturgus abbreviatus Eggers, 1911a c
 Crypturgus alutaceus Schwarz, 1894 i c b
 Crypturgus apfelbecki Eggers, 1940g c
 Crypturgus atomus LeConte, 1868 c
 Crypturgus atticus Eggers, 1911a c
 Crypturgus barbeyi Strohmeyer, H., 1929b c
 Crypturgus beesoni Eggers, 1936d c
 Crypturgus borealis Swaine, 1917 i c b
 Crypturgus brevipennis Reitter, 1913a c
 Crypturgus cedris Eichhoff, 1868b c
 Crypturgus cinereus (Herbst, J.F.W., 1793) c g
 Crypturgus comatus Zimmermann, 1868 c
 Crypturgus concolor Wood & Bright, 1992 c
 Crypturgus corrugatus Swaine, J.M., 1917 c
 Crypturgus corsicus Eggers, 1923b c
 Crypturgus crebrellus Reitter, 1894a c
 Crypturgus cribrellus Reitter, 1895 g
 Crypturgus cylindricollis Eggers, 1940g c
 Crypturgus danicus Eggers, 1932e c
 Crypturgus dissimilis Zimmermann, 1868 c
 Crypturgus dubius Eichhoff, 1875 c
 Crypturgus filum Reitter, 1889b c
 Crypturgus gaunersdorferi Reitter, 1885b c
 Crypturgus hispidulus Thomson, C.G., 1870 c
 Crypturgus japonicus Schedl (Eggers in), 1979c c
 Crypturgus maulei Roubal, 1910 c
 Crypturgus mediterraneus Eichhoff, W.J., 1869 c
 Crypturgus minutissimus Zimmermann, 1868 c
 Crypturgus numidicus Ferrari, 1867a c
 Crypturgus parallelocollis Eichhoff, 1878b c
 Crypturgus pulicarius Zimmermann, 1868 c
 Crypturgus pullus Zimmermann, 1868 c
 Crypturgus punctatissimus Zimmermann, 1868 c
 Crypturgus pusillus (Gyllenhal, 1813) i c b
 Crypturgus subcribrosus Eggers, 1933f c
 Crypturgus tuberosus Niisima, 1909 c
 Crypturgus wollastoni Eichhoff, 1878b c

Data sources: i = ITIS, c = Catalogue of Life, g = GBIF, b = Bugguide.net

References

Further reading

External links

 

Scolytinae
Articles created by Qbugbot